Bäretswil is a municipality in the district of Hinwil in the canton of Zürich in Switzerland.

History
Bäretswil is first mentioned in 741  as Berofovilare.  In 745  it was mentioned as Perolfeswilari.

Geography

Of this area, 51.5% is used for agricultural purposes, while 39.1% is forested. Of the rest of the land, 8.2% is settled (buildings or roads) and the remainder (1.2%) is non-productive (rivers, glaciers or mountains).   housing and buildings made up 5.4% of the total area, while transportation infrastructure made up the rest (2.8%). Of the total unproductive area, water (streams and lakes) made up 0.2% of the area.   4.7% of the total municipal area was undergoing some type of construction.

The municipality is located in the hills between the Glatt and Töss Valleys.  It includes the villages of Bäretswil and Adetswil as well as the hamlets of Bettswil, Wappenswil, Hof-Neuthal, Tanne and Klein Bäretswil and scattered individual homes.

The old cotton mill, pictured, now houses museums of spinning and weaving machinery.

Demographics
, 8.9% of the population was made up of foreign nationals.   the gender distribution of the population was 49.9% male and 50.1% female. Over the last 10 years the population has grown at a rate of 10.2%. Most of the population speaks German  (93.9%), with Italian being second most common ( 1.7%) and Albanian being third ( 1.3%).

In the 2007 election, the most popular party was the SVP which received 46.2% of the vote.  The next three most popular parties were the CSP (16.8%), the SPS (9%) and the FDP (8.3%).

The age distribution of the population is children and teenagers (0–19 years old) make up 26.7% of the population, while adults (20–64 years old) make up 62.4% and seniors (over 64 years old) make up 10.9%.  The entire Swiss population is generally well educated.  In Bäretswil about 80.3% of the population (between age 25-64) have completed either non-mandatory upper secondary education or additional higher education (either university or a Fachhochschule).  There are 1649 households in Bäretswil.

Bäretswil has an unemployment rate of 1.37%.  , there were 204 people employed in the primary economic sector and about 73 businesses involved in this sector.  312 people are employed in the secondary sector and there are 70 businesses in this sector.  549 people are employed in the tertiary sector, with 120 businesses in this sector.   47.6% of the working population were employed full-time, and 52.4% were employed part-time.

 there were 898 Catholics and 2444 Protestants in Bäretswil. From the 2000 census, 60.4% were some type of Protestant, with 56.1% belonging to the Swiss Reformed Church and 4.3% belonging to other Protestant churches.  22.1% of the population were Catholic. Of the rest of the population, 0% were Muslim, 3.4% belonged to another religion (not listed), 2.9% did not give a religion, and 10.7% were atheist or agnostic.

The historical population is given in the following table:

 Population before and after the plague.

Transport 
There is no longer regular service on this line, but the Dampfbahn-Verein Zürcher Oberland heritage railway operates seasonal excursion service.

References

External links

 Official website 
 

Municipalities of the canton of Zürich